Making a Living (also known as Doing His Best, A Busted Johnny, Troubles, and Take My Picture) is the first film starring Charlie Chaplin. A one-reel comedy short, it was completed in three days at Keystone Studios in Los Angeles, California and was released for distribution on February 2, 1914. In it Chaplin portrays a charming swindler who runs afoul of a news reporter and a Keystone Cop. In addition to co-writing the "scenario" and directing the production, Henry Lehrman performs as the principal supporting character.

Plot
In the film’s opening scene, Chaplin's character, the "Swindler", attempts to convince a passerby (Henry Lehrman) to give him money. Chaplin is next shown flirting with a young woman and proposing marriage to her, which she accepts. Lehrman, who portrays a news reporter, now approaches the woman and presents to her a bouquet of flowers and a ring, which she refuses to accept, noting that she is now engaged. Lerhman sees Chaplin and a slapstick fight between the two immediately ensues. Later, while prowling for a news story, Lehrman's character witnesses and photographs an automobile accident, capturing on film a dramatic image of a car tumbling down a high, steep hill. As he and a crowd of onlookers are trying to help the unfortunate motorist, who is pinned beneath his wrecked car, Chaplin passes by and steals the camera that contains the sensational photograph. He then runs to the local newspaper office with the image and to report the auto accident, claiming them as his own. A short pursuit with the Keystone cops follows, and then an infuriated Lehrman catches up with Chaplin, and they resume their fistfight on a downtown street. An oncoming streetcar scoops them up on its front cowcatcher and continues down the street and out of frame.

Cast 

 Charlie Chaplin as Swindler
 Henry Lehrman as Reporter
 Emma Clifton as jealous husband's wife
 Virginia Kirtley as Daughter
 Alice Davenport as Mother
 Minta Durfee as Woman
 Chester Conklin as Policeman / Bum
 Charles Inslee as Newspaper Editor (uncredited)

Production
Chaplin wears a large moustache and a top hat in the film; he also carries a walking cane. His famous "Little Tramp" screen persona did not appear until his next film, Kid Auto Races at Venice, which was released by Keystone only five days after the studio began distributing Making a Living. In recalling his work with Lehrman in Making a Living, Chaplin maintained that the director had "deliberately" removed the best parts of his performance from the short's final cut. Lehrman, according to Chaplin, was "a vain man", who years later actually "confessed" to misediting the footage because he felt the young Englishman was arrogant and "knew too much".

In his extensive 1985 biography of the comedian, Chaplin: His Life and Art, English film critic and historian David Robinson provides further insight into the short's production, including its filming locations, the evolution of the Chaplin's costume selections for his screen debut, and his acting style in some scenes:

Although Lehrman and Reed Heustis are often credited with co-writing the film's scenario, Chaplin in his autobiography offers his view on the screenplay's status when production began. "We had no story", he writes, adding "It was to be a documentary about the printing press done with a few comedy touches." He then states that Lehrman appeared to be "groping for ideas", so as a "newcomer at Keystone" he began to make suggestions. "This", Chaplin continues, "was where I created antagonism with Lehrman."

The footage of street scenes depicts various areas of downtown Los Angeles in 1914. In the scene with the swindler and newspaper reporter fighting in the road, the sign of the Fremont Hotel is shown briefly in the background. That hotel closed in the 1940s, and the entire structure was demolished in 1955.

Reception

In its February 7, 1914 issue, the widely read New York-based trade journal The Moving Picture World gives the comedy short a brief but very positive review:

In the months following the film's release, as it circulated across the United States, many city and small-town newspapers, like The Sentinel-Record in Hot Springs, Arkansas, judged the short to be a "laugh", as yet another one of Keystone's "always good and boisterous comedies"; and they encouraged their readers to see it. The local paper in Chickasha, Oklahoma characterized Making a Living as "truly a scream from start to finish", while in Bemidji, Minnesota, the Majestic Theatre promoted it as a "peach", adding "If you never laughed before you will certainly do so if you see this comedy." In those and other remarks about the film in 1914 and in newspaper advertisements promoting the comedy, Charlie Chaplin and his fellow performers are rarely mentioned by name, which at that time was not an uncommon practice outside the realm of film-industry publications, especially with regard to new performers in one-reelers. In June 1914, however, the Dittmann Theatre in Brownsville, Texas did mention in the town's newspaper that its screening of Making a Living included a "new comedian in the Keystone comedy", an entertainer the theatre identified as "Charles Chappel." Little did that theatre’s management or moviegoers in general know that by the end of the following year, Mr. Chappel would be an established national and international film celebrity and a growing cultural phenomenon.

One scene in particular in Making a Living excited audiences and even prompted film-industry observers in 1914 to comment about Lehrman's and Keystone's willingness to spend considerable amounts of money on their motion-picture projects, even on simple one-reel shorts. The scene is the car accident. The Motion Picture News, another popular New York-based trade publication, reported the financial cost of staging that accident during production:

See also
 Charlie Chaplin filmography

References and notes

External links 
 
 
 

1914 films
1914 comedy films
1914 short films
Silent American comedy films
American silent short films
American black-and-white films
Films directed by Henry Lehrman
Films produced by Mack Sennett
Keystone Studios films
Articles containing video clips
1910s American films